The 1994–95 NBA season was the Bullets' 34th season in the National Basketball Association. In the 1994 NBA draft, the Bullets selected Juwan Howard from the University of Michigan with the fifth overall pick. In the off-season, the team acquired Scott Skiles from the Orlando Magic, and hired Jim Lynam as head coach. During the first month of the regular season, the Bullets traded Tom Gugliotta to the Golden State Warriors in exchange for Howard's former "Fab Five" teammate at Michigan, second-year star Chris Webber. However, after a 4–1 start to the season, the Bullets struggled losing 25 of their next 28 games, which included a ten-game losing streak, and held an 11–34 record at the All-Star break.

At midseason, things got worse as Kevin Duckworth dealt with continuing weight problems, and was suspended indefinitely after 40 games for not staying in physical condition, where he weighed over 310 lbs. The Bullets posted a 13-game losing streak between March and April, and finished last place in the Atlantic Division with a 21–61 record.

Webber averaged 20.1 points, 9.6 rebounds, 4.7 assists, 1.5 steals and 1.6 blocks per game in 54 games, missing 19 games due to a shoulder injury, while Howard averaged 17.0 points and 8.4 rebounds per game, and was named to the NBA All-Rookie Second Team, and second-year guard Calbert Cheaney provided the team with 16.6 points per game. In addition, Rex Chapman contributed 16.2 points per game in only just 45 games due to groin and thumb injuries, while Skiles provided with 13.0 points and 7.3 assists per game, Don MacLean contributed 11.0 points per game, but only played just 39 games due to knee and thumb injuries, and second-year center Gheorghe Mureșan averaged 10.0 points, 6.7 rebounds and 1.7 blocks per game, and also finished tied in third place in Most Improved Player voting. Second-year guard Mitchell Butler contributed 7.9 points per game, while Duckworth averaged 7.1 points and 4.9 rebounds per game, and Doug Overton provided with 7.0 points and 3.0 assists per game.

Following the season, Chapman was traded to the Miami Heat, while Skiles signed as a free agent with the Philadelphia 76ers during the next season, Duckworth was traded to the Milwaukee Bucks, MacLean and Doug Overton were both dealt to the Denver Nuggets, and Larry Stewart left in the 1995 NBA Expansion Draft.

Draft picks

Roster

Roster Notes
 Center Kevin Duckworth was suspended indefinitely after playing 40 games, due to weight problems and not maintaining playing shape.
 Point guard Brent Price missed the entire season due to a knee injury, and was waived on April 19.
 Rookie small forward Anthony Tucker was waived on April 19.

Regular season

Season standings

z – clinched division title
y – clinched division title
x – clinched playoff spot

Record vs. opponents

Game log

Regular season

|- align="center" bgcolor="#ffcccc"
| 17
| December 13, 19948:30p.m. EST
| @ Houston
| L 85–93
| Webber (22)
| Webber (16)
| Skiles (5)
| The Summit13,889
| 6–11

|- align="center"
|colspan="9" bgcolor="#bbcaff"|All-Star Break
|- style="background:#cfc;"
|- bgcolor="#bbffbb"
|- align="center" bgcolor="#ffcccc"
| 48
| February 17, 19957:30p.m. EST
| Houston
| L 92–109
| Howard, Webber (20)
| Webber (15)
| Webber (7)
| USAir Arena18,756
| 12–36

Player statistics

Regular season

 Statistics with the Washington Bullets.

Awards and records
 Juwan Howard, NBA All-Rookie 2nd Team

Transactions

Overview

  Later waived.
  Signed for the rest of the season after a 10-day contract.

Trades

Free agents

Additions

Subtractions

Waivings

Player Transactions Citation:

References

See also
 1994–95 NBA season

Washington Wizards seasons
Wash
Wiz
Wiz